New Flyer is a Canadian multinational bus manufacturer, specializing in the production of transit buses. New Flyer is owned by the NFI Group, a holding company for several bus manufacturers. New Flyer has several manufacturing facilities in Canada and the United States that produce the company's main product, the New Flyer Xcelsior family of buses.

History

New Flyer was founded by John Coval in 1930 as the Western Auto and Truck Body Works Ltd in Manitoba. The company began producing buses in 1937, selling their first full buses to Grey Goose Bus Lines in 1937, before releasing their Western Flyer bus model in 1941, prompting the company to change its name to Western Flyer Coach in 1948.

In the 1960s, the company further focused on the urban transit bus market. In 1971, the then-financially struggling Western Flyer was sold to the Manitoba Development Corporation, an agency of the government of Manitoba, and renamed Flyer Industries Limited. In 1974 the opposition Progressive Conservative Party of Manitoba had urged the NDP government in power to divest Flyer Industries from government ownership.

On July 15, 1986, Jan den Oudsten, a descendant of the family who formed Dutch bus manufacturer Den Oudsten Bussen BV, purchased Flyer Industries from the Manitoba government, changing its name to New Flyer Industries Limited.

New Flyer designed and tested North America's first low-floor bus in 1988 and delivered the first production model, called the D40LF, to the Port Authority of New York and New Jersey in 1991. In 1994, New Flyer delivered the first compressed natural gas bus in North America and the world's first hydrogen fuel cell powered bus. In 1995, the company delivered the first low-floor articulated bus in North America to Strathcona County Transit.

In March 2002, New Flyer was acquired by KPS Capital Partners, an investment company that specializes in turning around struggling businesses, for $44 million. Later that year Jan den Oudsten retired as CEO. He was later inducted into the American Public Transportation Association's Hall of Fame for his work at the company.

In 2003, King County Metro in Seattle placed an order for 213 hybrid buses, the world's first large order for hybrid buses.

On December 15, 2003, New Flyer was purchased by private equity firms Harvest Partners and Lightyear Capital. The company's CEO, John Marinucci, called the purchase an indicator that the company's operational and financial turnaround had been accomplished.

On August 19, 2005, New Flyer became a publicly traded company on the Toronto Stock Exchange, renaming the company to New Flyer Industries Canada ULC and creating the publicly traded parent company NFI Group Inc. 2005 also saw a restyling of New Flyer's popular low-floor coaches with new front and rear endcaps, to modernize and streamline the exterior appearance of the bus.

In June 2012 New Flyer, in a joint venture with Mitsubishi Heavy Industries, the Manitoba Government, Manitoba Hydro and Red River College, unveiled a fully electric battery-powered bus.

In May 2012, New Flyer and Alexander Dennis announced a joint venture to design and manufacture medium-duty low-floor bus (or midi bus) for the North American market. The bus, called the New Flyer MiDi, was based on the design of the Alexander Dennis Enviro200. Alexander Dennis engineered and tested the bus, and it was built and marketed by New Flyer under contract. During the partnership around 200 buses were delivered to 22 operators in Canada and the U.S. In May 2017, New Flyer and Alexander Dennis announced their joint venture would end and production of the bus would transition to Alexander Dennis' new North American factory in Indiana, where it is produced alongside the double-deck Enviro500 series bus. Alexander Dennis was later purchased by New Flyer's parent company, NFI Group, in 2019.

Models

References

External links

 Official website
 History of New Flyer

 
Bus manufacturers of Canada
Canadian brands
Canadian companies established in 1930
Vehicle manufacturing companies established in 1930
Hybrid electric bus manufacturers
Manufacturing companies based in Winnipeg
Natural gas vehicles
Trolleybus manufacturers
1930 establishments in Manitoba